Vadym is a Ukrainian given name. Notable people with the name include:
Vadym Antipov (born 1988), Ukrainian football striker
Vadym Bolokhan (born 1986), professional Moldovan football defender
Vadym Deonas (born 1975), professional Ukrainian football goalkeeper
Vadim Gutzeit (born 1971), Olympic champion fencer and Ukraine's Youth and Sport Minister
Vadym Hetman (1935–1998), Ukrainian statesman and banker
Vadym Ishmakov (born 1979), Ukrainian footballer
Vadym Kalmykov, Paralympian athlete from Ukraine
Vadym Kharchenko (born 1975), Ukrainian football midfielder
Vadym Kolesnik (born 2001), Ukrainian-born ice dancer
Vadym Kyrylov (born 1981), Ukrainian football striker
Vadym Meller (1884–1962), Ukrainian-Russian Soviet painter, theatrical designer, book illustrator and architect
Vadym Melnyk (born 1980), professional Ukrainian football defender
Vadym Milko (born 1986), professional Ukrainian football midfielder
Vadym Panas (born 1985), professional Ukrainian football midfielder
Vadym Rybalchenko (born 1988), professional Ukrainian football midfielder
Vadym Sapay (born 1986), professional Ukrainian football midfielder
Vadym Sosnikhin (born 1942), Ukrainian Soviet football player
Vadym Tyshchenko (born 1963), retired Soviet and Ukrainian football player and current football coach
Vadym Yevtushenko (born 1958), former Ukrainian footballer

Ukrainian masculine given names